This is a list of New Zealand television events and premieres which occurred, or are scheduled to occur, in 1992, the 32nd year of continuous operation of television in New Zealand.

This is a list of New Zealand television-related events in 1992.

Events
January - March – Channel 2 ran 24 hours a day, seven days a week. It returned to a nightly closedown in the first week of April.
8 January – Australian television series for children and preschoolers Johnson and Friends aired on Channel 2 for the very last time and would return to air on New Zealand television in 1996 with TV One picking up the series. As of that day, only the first series was shown on Channel 2.
11 February – TV3 debuted American sitcom based on the stand-up comedy of comedian and actor Tim Allen Home Improvement.
23 March – After two years of airing on TV3, the British children's television series Thomas the Tank Engine & Friends returned to screen on TVNZ with Channel 2 airing the series as part of the Jase TV block.
25 May – New Zealand medical soap opera Shortland Street, debuted on Channel 2 and becomes the longest running soap still in production.
11 June – New Zealand soap opera Homeward Bound debuted on TV3 and ran for 22 episodes.
July - Television hours were reduced due to the power crisis.
6 July - Fifty Forward an exercise program debuts on TV1. 
13 July – A New Zealand show for preschoolers under 5 You and Me, starring Pauline Cooper as host, began on TV3.
10 August – Channel 2 picked up Shining Time Station, the American spinoff series of Thomas the Tank Engine & Friends.
20 August – New Zealand drama series Marlin Bay premiered on Channel 2.
10 October – Wheel of Fortune ran a celebrity episode on Channel 2 featuring David Tua, said "O for Awesome".

Debuts

Domestic
3 February – Jase TV (Channel 2) (1992)
3 February – 3pm (TV3) (1992)
3 February – The Son of a Gunn Show (Channel 2) (1992–1995)
25 May – Shortland Street (Channel 2) (1992–present)
11 June – Homeward Bound (TV3) (1992)
22 June – Jeopardy! (TV One) (1992–1993)
13 July – You and Me (TV3) (1992–1998)
20 August – Marlin Bay (1992–1994)
Face the Music (Channel 2) (1992–1994)

International
2 January –  Spider! (Channel 2)
5 January –  Come In Spinner (TV One)
5 January –  The Magnum Story (TV One)
9 January –  Stuck with Each Other (TV One)
9 January –  Brum (Channel 2)
18 January –  James Brown: Living in America (Channel 2)
18 January –  The Railway Dragon (Channel 2)
18 January –  Delancey Street: The Crisis Within (Channel 2)
3 February –  American Detective (Channel 2)
3 February –  Fiddley Foodle Bird (Channel 2)
3 February –  Stay Lucky (TV One)
4 February –  Short, Sharp and Shocking (TV One)
6 February –  Dinky Di's (Channel 2)
8 February –  The Pirates of Dark Water (Channel 2)
8 February –  Toxic Crusaders (Channel 2)
8 February –  Mr. Bogus (Channel 2)
8 February –  Hammerman (Channel 2)
9 February –  The Girl From Mars (Channel 2)
9 February – / Captain Zed and the Zee Zone (Channel 2)
9 February –  The Winjin' Pom (Channel 2)
11 February –  Home Improvement (TV3)
11 February –  Good & Evil (TV3)
22 February –  Burke's Backyard (TV One)
7 March – / Potsworth & Co (Channel 2)
8 March –  Lost in the Barrens (Channel 2)
13 March –  James Bond Jr. (Channel 2)
13 March – / C.L.Y.D.E. (Channel 2)
22 March –  Elly & Jools (Channel 2)
29 March – / To Catch a Killer (Channel 2)
1 April –  Felix the Cat (1990s) (Channel 2)
2 April –  Bottom (Channel 2)
4 April –  The Shape of the World (TV One)
5 April –  Frozen Assets (TV3)
5 April –  The Adventures of Super Mario Bros. 3 (Channel 2)
5 April –  Space Cats (Channel 2)
5 April –  You Can't Grow Again (Channel 2)
5 April –  Curse of the Viking Grave (Channel 2)
5 April –  The Dreamstone (Channel 2)
6 April –  Joshua Jones (Channel 2)
2 May –  The Darling Buds of May (TV One)
14 May –  A Tale of Two Cities (1989) (TV One)
24 May –  In a Child's Name (Channel 2)
24 May – // Madeline Specials (Channel 2)
31 May – // Diplodos (Channel 2)
5 June –  Once Again (TV One)
6 June –  Tom & Jerry Kids (Channel 2)
6 June –  Stephen King's World of Horror (TV3)
6 June –  New Faces (TV3)
8 June –  The Missionaries (TV One)
10 June –  The Josephine Baker Story (TV3)
11 June –  Lonesome Dove (TV One)
14 June –  The Men's Room (TV One)
21 June –  The Worst Day of My Life (Channel 2)
21 June –  The Girl from Tomorrow (Channel 2)
26 June –  Three Little Ghosts (Channel 2)
7 July –  Lightning Force (Channel 2)
14 July –  Cop It Sweet (TV3)
2 August –  Dodgem (Channel 2)
2 August –  The New Lassie (Channel 2)
4 August –  Nurses (TV3)
8 August – / Where's Wally? (Channel 2)
10 August –  Playdays (Channel 2)
10 August –  Shining Time Station (Channel 2)
11 August –  Phoenix (TV One)
14 August –  The Cloning of Joanna May (TV One)
23 August –  Intruders (Channel 2)
28 September –  Noddy's Toyland Adventures (Channel 2)
3 October –  Harry and the Hendersons (Channel 2)
4 October –  Super Mario World (Channel 2)
5 October –  Lamb Chop's Play-Along (Channel 2)
11 October –  Koorana-Crocodile's New Beginning (TV3)
11 October –  Diana: A Portrait (TV One)
11 October –  Clarissa (TV One)
12 October –  Eddie Dodd (Channel 2)
13 October –  Jungle Tales (Channel 2)
22 October –  When Will I Be Loved? (TV3)
1 November –  Voices Within: The Lives of Truddi Chase (TV3)
1 November –  This is Garth Brooks (TV3)
2 November –  Shattered Dreams (Channel 2)
3 November –  Swans Crossing (Channel 2)
25 December –  Father Christmas (Channel 2)
25 December –  Santa's First Christmas (Channel 2)
 Top of the Heap (Channel 2)
 Dinosaurs (TV3)
 Video Power (Channel 2)
 TaleSpin (TV3)
 Just So Stories (Channel 2)
 Doug (Channel 2)
 The Adventures of Mark and Brian (TV3)
 Kidd Video (TV3)
 Zoo Olympics (Channel 2)
 Truckers (Channel 2)
 Wish Kid (Channel 2)
// Rupert (Channel 2)
/ The Transformers (TV3)
 Funky Fables (Channel 2)
/ Widget (TV3)
 The Ren and Stimpy Show (Channel 2)
 Bob in a Bottle (Channel 2)
 King Rollo (Channel 2)
 The Brittas Empire (TV One)
 We All Have Tales (Channel 2)
/ Bucky O'Hare and the Toad Wars! (Channel 2)
 Topsy and Tim (Channel 2)
 Lazer Tag Academy (Channel 2)
 Camp Candy (TV3)
 Yo, Yogi! (Channel 2)

Changes to network affiliation
This is a list of programs which made their premiere on a New Zealand television network that had previously premiered on another New Zealand television network. The networks involved in the switch of allegiances are predominantly both free-to-air networks or both subscription television networks. Programs that have their free-to-air/subscription television premiere, after previously premiering on the opposite platform (free-to air to subscription/subscription to free-to air) are not included. In some cases, programs may still air on the original television network. This occurs predominantly with programs shared between subscription television networks.

International

Subscription television

International

Subscription premieres
This is a list of programs which made their premiere on New Zealand subscription television that had previously premiered on New Zealand free-to-air television. Programs may still air on the original free-to-air television network.

International

Television shows
What Now (1981–present)
The Early Bird Show (1989–1992)
New Zealand's Funniest Home Videos (1990–1993)
60 Minutes (1990–present)
Wheel of Fortune (1991–1996)
The Ralston Group (1991–1994)
Marlin Bay (1992–1994)
Shortland Street (1992–present)
You and Me (1992–1998)

Ending this year
29 October – Homeward Bound (TV3 (1992) 
The Early Bird Show (TV3) (1989–1992)
A Dog's Show (TV One) (1977–1992)
Shark in the Park (TV One) (1989–1992)
Jase TV (Channel 2) (1992)